1792 election may refer to:
1792 French National Convention election
1792 United States presidential election